The Seyed Bagher Ab anbar is a historical Ab anbar of Qajar dynasty that is located in city center of Bardaskan, in Ghaem Avenue. This Ab anbar was added to the list of National Monuments of Iran As the 11034st monument.

This building, which is located in the center of Bardaskan, was built by a good and virtuous man named Seyyed Baqer Mousavi and is known by the same name.Its outstanding features are 2 very beautiful windbreaks, one 4-way windbreak above the conical dome of the reservoir and the other at a height of 3 meters from the foot of the conical dome to the east and allows the entry of suitable air into the reservoir, which plays an important role in keeping water cold Had a tank.

Gallery

See also 
 Aliabad Tower
 Firuzabad Tower
 Abdolabad Tomb
 Cultural Heritage, Handcrafts and Tourism Organization
 Iran National Heritage List

Notes and references 

Buildings and structures in Bardaskan
Tourist attractions in Razavi Khorasan Province